Smoky Canyon is a 1952 American Western musical film directed by Fred F. Sears and starring Charles Starrett, Jock Mahoney, Danni Sue Nolan, Tris Coffin, and Larry Hudson. The film was released by Columbia Pictures on January 31, 1952.

Plot ~ A range war erupts between the cattlemen and the sheep men, and a masked vigilante helps to settle it.
(by DJK- 2023, taken from GET TV’s plot synopsis)

Cast
Charles Starrett as Steve Driscoll / The Durango Kid
Jock Mahoney as Jack Mahoney (as Jack Mahoney)
Danni Sue Nolan as Roberta 'Rob' Woodstock (as Dani Sue Nolan)
Tris Coffin as Carl Buckley
Larry Hudson as Sheriff Bogart
Raider as Durango's Horse
Bullet as Steve's Horse
Smiley Burnette as Smiley Burnette
Chris Alcaide as Lars - Henchman (uncredited)
Dick Botiller as Cattleman (uncredited)
Russell Custer as Townsman (uncredited)
Chick Hannan as Townsman (uncredited)
Leroy Johnson as Ace (uncredited)
Guy Madison as Henchman (uncredited)
Gerald Mohr as Narrator (voice) (uncredited)
Boyd 'Red' Morgan as Joe - Henchman (uncredited)
Frank O'Connor as Jim Woodstock (uncredited)
Sandy Sanders as Spade (uncredited)
Charles Stevens as Johnny Big Foot (uncredited)
Forrest Taylor as Mr. Wyler (uncredited)
Blackie Whiteford as Townsman (uncredited)

References

External links

1952 Western (genre) films
1950s Western (genre) musical films
1950s English-language films
American Western (genre) musical films
1952 films
American black-and-white films
Columbia Pictures films
Films directed by Fred F. Sears
1950s American films